The Seven Sacraments of Nicolas Poussin is a play by Neil Bartlett inspired by the Seven Sacraments series of paintings by Nicolas Poussin. It was commissioned in 1997 by Artangel.

1997 plays
English plays